Poyet may refer to:
Diego Poyet (born 1995), Uruguayan footballer, son of Gus Poyet
Gus Poyet (born 1967), Uruguayan football manager and former player
Guillaume Poyet (c. 1473–1548), French magistrate
Romain Poyet (born 1980), French footballer, currently playing for Stade Brestois 29